Great Western Railway absorbed locomotives gives details of Great Western Railway absorbed locomotives which do not yet have individual pages.

The grouping
Under the terms of the Railways Act 1921, the Great Western Railway (GWR) amalgamated with six companies – the "constituent companies" - and absorbed a large number of others – the "subsidiary companies". All of the constituent companies and ten of the subsidiary companies owned locomotives, ranging from the Taff Vale Railway which had 275 locomotives (one of which was not taken into GWR stock), to the Cleobury Mortimer and Ditton Priors Light Railway and the Gwendraeth Valleys Railway, with just two each. The constituent companies were amalgamated on 1 January 1922, some of the subsidiary companies being absorbed on the same date, the rest following at intervals until July 1923. Two more undertakings, not mentioned in the Act, which were responsible for shunting at Swansea Docks, sold their locomotives to the GWR soon afterwards.

Alexandra (Newport and South Wales) Docks and Railway
Thirty-nine locomotives acquired by the GWR on 1 January 1922.

Barry Railway

Brecon and Merthyr Tydfil Junction Railway

Forty-seven locomotives were acquired by the GWR on 1 July 1922

Burry Port and Gwendraeth Valley Railway

Cambrian Railways
Ninety-nine locomotives were acquired by the GWR on 1 January 1922, including five narrow gauge: three on the Vale of Rheidol Railway, and two on the Welshpool and Llanfair Light Railway

Cardiff Railway

Cleobury Mortimer and Ditton Priors Light Railway
Two locomotives were acquired by the GWR on 1 January 1922

Gwendraeth Valleys Railway
Two 0-6-0ST locomotives were acquired by the GWR on 1 January 1923. One was given the GWR number 26, but the second (Margret) was sold in 1923 without being allocated a GWR number.

Llanelly and Mynydd Mawr Railway
Eight locomotives acquired by the GWR on 1 January 1923
 312 Andrew Barclay 0-6-0T, George Waddell
 339 Hudswell Clarke 0-6-0T, Tarndune
 803 Hudswell Clarke 0-6-0T, Ravelston
 937 Hudswell Clarke 0-6-0T, Merkland
 359 Hudswell Clarke 0-6-0ST, Hilda
 704 Manning Wardle 0-6-0T, Victory
 944 Avonside Engine Company 0-6-0T, Great Mountain
 969 Fox, Walker and Company 0-6-0ST, Seymour Clarke

Midland and South Western Junction Railway

Neath and Brecon Railway

Port Talbot Railway and Docks Company

Powlesland and Mason

Rhondda and Swansea Bay Railway
Thirty-seven locomotives acquired by the GWR on 1 January 1922
 164 - 179, 181 Kitson 0-6-2T
 180, 182 Robert Stephenson & Company 0-6-2T ex Port Talbot Railway
 728, 1167, 1652, 1660 ex-GWR 1076 Class 0-6-0ST
 789, 801, 802, 805, 806 Beyer, Peacock & Company 0-6-0T
 1307, 1309, 1310 Kitson 2-4-2T
 1710, 1756 ex-GWR 1701 Class 0-6-0ST
 1825, 1834 ex-GWR 1813 Class 0-6-0ST
 2756 ex-GWR 2721 Class 0-6-0ST

Rhymney Railway

South Wales Mineral Railway
Five locomotives acquired by the GWR on 1 January 1923
 817 - 818 ex-South Devon Railway Buffalo class 0-6-0ST
 1546, 1806, 1811 ex-GWR 645 Class 0-6-0ST

Swansea Harbour Trust

Taff Vale Railway
275 locomotives were acquired by the GWR on 1 January 1922

See also
 GWR 0-4-0ST
 Welsh 0-6-2T locomotives
 Locomotives of the Great Western Railway

Notes

References

Absorbed locos 1922 on